Fang Wen may refer to the following people:

, a poet of the Ming and Qing dynasties
Astor Fong, a Hong Kong singer-songwriter
Wen Fong, a Chinese-American historian of East Asian art